Parapoynx zambiensis is a moth in the family Crambidae. It was described by David John Lawrence Agassiz in 2012. It is found in the Democratic Republic of the Congo, Botswana and Zambia.

The wingspan is 15–18 mm. The forewings are brown mixed with whitish, but pale brown at the costa. The hindwings are whitish. Adults have been recorded on wing in January and December.

Etymology
The species name refers to Zambia, where most specimens originate.

References

Acentropinae
Moths described in 2012